The Port Huron Border Cats were a minor professional ice hockey team in the United Hockey League that played from 1996 to 2002. The team was based in Port Huron, Michigan, and played at McMorran Place. The team ceased operations in 2002 and was replaced by another UHL expansion team, the Port Huron Beacons.

Coaches
 Dave Cameron (1996–1997)
 Doug Crossman (1997–1998)
 Greg Puhalski (1998–2000)
 Jean Laforest (2000–2002)

Season-by-season results

References

External links
 Port Huron Border Cats CoHL statistics at HockeyDB
 Port Huron Border Cats UHL statistics at HockeyDB

Defunct United Hockey League teams
Defunct ice hockey teams in the United States
Professional ice hockey teams in Michigan
Port Huron, Michigan
Ice hockey clubs established in 1996
Sports clubs disestablished in 2002
1996 establishments in Michigan
2002 disestablishments in Michigan
Florida Panthers minor league affiliates